Eduardo Hernán Gómez Cortez (born June 2, 1958 in Ovalle, Chile), known as Eduardo Gómez, is a former Chilean footballer who played for clubs of Chile. He played as a defender.

Career
Mocho played as a defender for Deportes Ovalle, Cobreloa and the Chile national football team, who he competed with at the 1987 Copa América.

Teams
  Deportes Ovalle 1978
  Cobreloa 1979
  San Marcos de Arica 1980
  Cobreloa 1981-1990
  Universidad de Chile 1991
  Deportes La Serena 1992-1994
  Deportes Ovalle 1995-2003

Titles
  Cobreloa 1982, 1985, and 1988 (Chilean Primera División Championship), 1986 (Copa Chile)

References

External links
 
 

1958 births
Living people
Chilean footballers
Chile international footballers
Cobreloa footballers
Deportes La Serena footballers
Deportes Ovalle footballers
San Marcos de Arica footballers
Universidad de Chile footballers
Chilean Primera División players
Primera B de Chile players
1987 Copa América players
Association football defenders
People from Ovalle